José María Rivas Martínez (12 May 1958 – 9 January 2016) was a football player from El Salvador.

Club career
Nicknamed Mandingo, Rivas played several years for Independiente De San Vicente and Atlético Marte, with whom he won a League Championship in 1985. In 1990, he joined San Pedro of Belize and after leaving them had short spells at the end of his career in the Salvadoran second division with Huracán
and Cojutepeque.

He won the 1985 Top league goal scorer award and also won the Golden Boot and Golden Ball in that year.

International career
The moustached Rivas made his official debut for El Salvador in a March 1980 friendly match against Panama, played in 17 FIFA World Cup qualification matches and featured in all three of El Salvador's games at the 1982 FIFA World Cup in Spain. He scored 19 goals for the El Salvador national football team from 1980 to 1989. He scored 42 goals in 97 matches including non-official games.

His final international game was a November 1989 FIFA World Cup qualification match against the United States in St. Louis.

Retirement and illness
After he retired, he was in charge of C.D. Árabe Marte and took the reins at FAS in 1999 along with José Luis Rugamas.

During his playing career, he had obtained his medical diplomas to become a doctor and was part of the El Salvador national football team medical staff. In June 2011, it became clear Rivas was seriously ill and needed a marrow operation, for which funds would be raised with a benefit match. A lot of former players were reunited to help Rivas. Rivas died of leukemia on 9 January 2016 at the age of 57.

References

External links
History - Atletico Marte 
Jose Maria Rivas -Atletico Marte - Atletico Marte 

1958 births
2016 deaths
Sportspeople from San Salvador
Association football forwards
Salvadoran footballers
El Salvador international footballers
1982 FIFA World Cup players
C.D. Atlético Marte footballers
Salvadoran expatriate footballers
Expatriate footballers in Belize
Salvadoran expatriate sportspeople in Belize
Premier League of Belize players